Rukayya Umar Dawaiya (born 17 October 1985) is a Nigerian Kannywood actress from Kano State Nigeria.

Early life and education
Rukayya Umar Dawayya was born on 17 October 1985 in Kano. Her father is a business man from Matazu, Katsina State while her mother is from Borno State. Dawayya did her Primary and Secondary schools in Kano where she obtained a certificate in Arabic language in Saudi Arabia. Dawayya also obtained the National Diploma in Mass Communication from Bayero University Kano.

Career
Rukayya Umar Dawaiya made her film debut in 2000 in her debut film "Dawayya" which earned her the title of Dawayya. According to her website, she has made a name for herself in the film Dawayya which has inspired her to continue making films.
Dawayya has made over 150 films in the Hausa Film industry. Dawayya is an ambassador to some companies inside and outside Nigeria. She is also a politician and business woman.

Personal life
Dawayya married in 2012 and divorced in 2014. She has a son who was born in Mecca Saudi Arabia.

References 

1985 births
Nigerian film actresses
Living people
Actresses in Hausa cinema
21st-century Nigerian actresses
Hausa people
20th-century Nigerian actresses
People from Kano State
Bayero University Kano alumni
Nigerian businesspeople
Nigerian women in business
Nigerian actor-politicians
Nigerian politicians